Methacholine (INN, USAN) (trade name Provocholine), also known as Acetyl-β-methylcholine, is a synthetic choline ester that acts as a non-selective muscarinic receptor agonist in the parasympathetic nervous system.

Medical uses 

Methacholine is primarily used to diagnose bronchial hyperreactivity, which is the hallmark of asthma and also occurs in chronic obstructive pulmonary disease. This is accomplished through the bronchial challenge test, or methacholine challenge, in which a subject inhales aerosolized methacholine, leading to bronchoconstriction. Other therapeutic uses are limited by its adverse cardiovascular effects, such as bradycardia and hypotension, which arise from its function as a cholinomimetic.

Pharmacology 
It is highly active at all of the muscarinic receptors, but has little effect on the nicotinic receptors. Methacholine has a charged quaternary amine structure, rendering it insoluble to lipid cell membranes. Clinically, this means that it will not cross the blood–brain barrier and has poor absorption from the gastrointestinal tract. It is broken down at a relatively slow rate within the body, due to its relative resistance to acetylcholinesterases.

The chemical structure of methacholine is identical to acetylcholine but with a methyl group on the beta carbon (hence being called acetyl-β-methylcholine), this β-methyl group provides selectivity towards muscarinic receptors as compared to nicotinic receptors. The quaternary ammonium group is essential for activity. The ester makes it susceptible to the enzyme acetylcholine esterase.

Contraindications 

Use of methacholine is contraindicated in patients with recent heart attack or stroke, uncontrolled hypertension, known severe airway disease, or an aortic aneurysm. It may be used with caution by nursing or pregnant mothers and patients taking certain medications for myasthenia gravis.

References

External links 
 
 

Choline esters
Quaternary ammonium compounds
Acetate esters
Muscarinic agonists
Peripherally selective drugs